A Aa E Ee may refer to:

A Aa E Ee (2006 film), directed by N. R. Nanjunde Gowda
A Aa E Ee (2009 Tamil film), directed by Sabapathy Dekshinamurthy
A Aa E Ee (2009 Telugu film), directed by Srinivasa Reddy